Cholius leucopeplalis is a species of moth in the family Crambidae. It is found in Uzbekistan.

References

Moths described in 1900
Scopariinae